is a professional Japanese baseball player. He plays pitcher for the Tokyo Yakult Swallows.

External links

 NPB.com

1986 births
Living people
Baseball people from Tokyo
Aoyama Gakuin University alumni
Japanese baseball players
Nippon Professional Baseball pitchers
Tokyo Yakult Swallows players